Siak Sri Indrapura (Jawi: سياق سري ايندراڤورا ) is a town in Riau province of Indonesia and it is the capital (seat) of Siak Regency. It was the place of the Sultanate of Siak Sri Indrapura.

Climate
Siak Sri Indrapura has a tropical rainforest climate (Af) with heavy rainfall year-round.

References

Populated places in Riau
Regency seats of Riau